The TOMNET optimization Environment is a platform for solving applied optimization problems in Microsoft .NET. It makes it possible to use solvers like SNOPT, MINOS and CPLEX with one single model formulation. The solvers handle everything from linear programming and integer programming to global optimization.

External links 
  (home page)

Numerical software
Mathematical optimization software